Cyril Mandouki (born 21 August 1991) is a professional footballer who plays as a midfielder for Ligue 2 club Paris FC. Born in metropolitan France, he plays for the Martinique national team.

Club career
Mandouki signed with Paris FC on 22 June 2017, after successful seasons in the lower divisions with Créteil and Dunkerque. He made his professional debut with Paris FC in a Ligue 2 0–0 tie with Clermont Foot on 28 August 2017.

International career
Mandouki is of Martiniquais descent. In May 2019, he was named to the Martinique national team provisional team for the 2019 CONCACAF Gold Cup. He debuted for Martinique in a 1–1 2019–20 CONCACAF Nations League A tie with Trinidad and Tobago on 6 September 2019, scoring his side's only goal on his debut.

International goals
Scores and results list Martinique's goal tally first, score column indicates score after each Mandouki goal.

References

External links
 
 
 
 Paris FC Profile

1991 births
Living people
Footballers from Paris
Association football midfielders
Martiniquais footballers
Martinique international footballers
French footballers
French people of Martiniquais descent
USL Dunkerque players
US Créteil-Lusitanos players
Paris FC players
Ligue 2 players
Championnat National players
Championnat National 2 players